In English poetry, accent refers to the stressed syllable of a polysyllabic word, or a monosyllabic word that receives stress because it belongs to an "open class" of words (noun, verb, adjective, adverb) or because of "contrastive" or "rhetorical" stress. In basic analysis of a poem by scansion, accents can be represented by a short vertical line (') preceding the syllable, while the divisions between feet are shown by a slash (/). 

There is generally one accent in each foot, for example:
Be-'hold / her, 'sin-/gle 'in / the 'field
Yon 'sol-/i-'tar-/y 'high-/land 'lass!
'Reap-ing / and 'sing-/ing 'by / her-'self;
'Stop here /or 'gent-/ly 'pass.

See also
 Stress (linguistics)

References

External links
Fact Monster: accent

Poetic rhythm